Jovan Milutinović (born 14 January 2000) is a Serbian footballer who plays as a forward for SV Stockerau.

Club career

Floridsdorfer
After spells at Mauerwerk Sport and 1210 Wien, Milutinović joined Floridsdorfer in 2016. In 2017, Milutinović began playing with the reserve team of Floridsdorfer.

He got his professional debut for the club in the 2. Liga against Young Violets on 9 November 2018. He ended the 2018-19 season with four appearances 2. Liga. Beside that, he made 25 games and scored 20 goals for the reserve team, helping them reaching a fifth place in the Austrian 2. Landesliga. On 27 June 2019, Milutinović signed his first professional contract with Floridsdorfer.

In January 2020, he was loaned out to Wiener Stadtliga club SR Donaufeld for the rest of the 2019-20 season to gain some experience, as he at the time, only was playing for Floridsdorfer's reserve team. He played a total of three appearances for Donaufeld.

Kolubara
Milutinović moved to Serbian First League club FK Kolubara in the summer 2020. He made three appearances for the club, before leaving again at the end of the season.

SV Stockerau
After a spell at TEK Sloga in 2021, Milutinović returned to Austria in 2022, where he joined SV Stockerau.

References

External links
 
 Jovan Milutinović at ÖFB

Living people
2000 births
Association football forwards
Serbian footballers
Serbian expatriate footballers
Floridsdorfer AC players
FK Kolubara players
SV Stockerau players
2. Liga (Austria) players
Serbian First League players
Serbian expatriate sportspeople in Austria
Expatriate footballers in Austria